Mark Geoffrey Orchard (born 8 November 1978) is a New Zealand cricketer who played for Northern Districts.

Biography 
He was born in Hamilton.

In 2005-06 he and Joseph Yovich added 322 for the sixth wicket against Central Districts in Napier for the sixth wicket record.

References

1978 births
Living people
New Zealand cricketers
Northern Districts cricketers
Cricketers from Hamilton, New Zealand